Jansher Khan PP SI HI (born 15 June 1969, in Peshawar, Pakistan) is a former World No. 1 professional Pakistani squash player. During his career, he won the World Open a record eight times, and the British Open six times. Jansher Khan is widely regarded as one of the greatest squash players of all time. Ranked number 1 in the world from January 1988 till January 1998, (513 weeks) (118 months) (9.8 Years) Jansher Khan's retirement in 2001 brought an end to nearly 50 years of domination by Pakistan in the sport of squash. He was troubled by back, knee and groin injuries throughout his career.

Career

Jansher Khan first came to prominence at the age of 16 when he won the World Junior Squash Championships in Australia in 1986 and then the Senior World Open title in same year, by beating Australia's Chris Dittmar in the final. At the age of 16 he became the youngest winner in the history of squash and in the same year he also defeated world No.1 Jahangir Khan in Hong Kong Open.

Jansher Khan started his career as an employee of Pakistan Air Force. During his career, he won PSA Professional 293 matches out of total 331, PSA Professional Tour Finals 99 out of 118 and from 1993 until 1996 in 81 matches he was unbeaten for four years; his longest winning matches streak in top-level professional sports as recorded by Guinness World Records. His main competitor Jahangir Khan won PSA Professional 134 matches out of total 164, PSA Professional Tour Finals 61 out of 80 and from 1981 until 1986 in 70 matches he was unbeaten for five years.

Jansher Khan announced his retirement from squash in 2001. In late 2011 he was diagnosed with Parkinson's disease. In 2020, after suffering from severe back pain while praying and walking, Khan underwent double back surgery successfully at a local hospital in Peshawar, Pakistan.

Jansher Khan had these words of advice for young players after his successful surgery:
"I would advise today's young players that along with their hard training they must take special care of their back, knee and groin injuries and treat minor ailments timely to avoid serious problems in future."

Squash Coaching
In September 2020, on the request of the Chief Minister of Khyber Pakhtunkhwa Mahmood Khan, Jansher Khan joined the directorate general sports Khyber Pakhtunkhwa as a head squash coach. 

The facilities available to athletes in Khyber Pakhtunkhwa are unmatched in most other countries. On his appointment, Jansher Khan said, “I will do my best to fill the gap created in the game of squash and make the country a new world champion.”

JanSher Khan and Jahangir Khan Rivalry
Among the pantheon of all time squash greats, there are two men that share a name. Jansher Khan and Jahangir Khan dominated the sport for the best part of two decades. During the 1980s and 1990s they won the majority of 14 World Open titles and 16 British Open titles most are played between them. The records cover the 36 matches played between Jansher Khan and Jahangir Khan from their first meeting at the Pakistan Open in 1986, to their clash in the final of the Spanish Open in March 1991. From 36 matches played between Jansher Khan and Jahangir Khan. Jansher Khan won 19 Matches and Jahangir Khan won 17 matches. Jansher Khan crown 8 Record World Open and 06 British Open wile Jahangir Khan Crown 06 World Open and 10 British Open.

36 Matches (19 Win, 17 runner-up)

36 Matches (19 Win, 17 runner-up)

Awards and recognition

Hilal-i-Imtiaz (Crescent of Excellence) Award by the President of Pakistan in 1997
Sitara-i-Imtiaz (Star of Excellence) Award by the President of Pakistan in 1993
Pride of Performance Award by the President of Pakistan in 1988

Career 
World Championships: 9 finals (8 winner, 1 runner-up)

British Open: 9 finals (6 winner, 3 runner-up)

Hong Kong Squash Open: 9 finals (8 winner, 1 runner-up)

Pakistan Open: 9 finals (6 winner, 3 runner-up)

World Super Series: 4 finals (4 winner, 0 runner-up)

References

External links 
 
 

Pakistani male squash players
Pashtun people
1969 births
Living people
Racket sportspeople from Peshawar
Recipients of the Pride of Performance
Recipients of Sitara-i-Imtiaz
Recipients of Hilal-i-Imtiaz